Kringen is a surname. Notable people with the surname include:

Gøril Kringen (born 1972), Norwegian former football player and coach
John Kringen, American CIA official
Olav Kringen (1867–1951), Norwegian newspaper editor

See also
Battle of Kringen

Norwegian-language surnames